The European Amateur Championship is an annual amateur golf tournament played at various locations throughout Europe. It is organized by the European Golf Association and was one of the "Elite" tournaments recognized by the World Amateur Golf Ranking. It was first held in 1986.

The winner receives an invitation to the next Open Championship, provided they maintain their amateur status prior to the Open. Before 2016, the European Amateur was played after the Open and the invitation was for the next year's Open. Since 2017, the European Amateur has been played before the Open and the invitation applies to the current year. Both 2016 and 2017 winners received entry to the 2017 Open.

Format
The top 144 amateur men golfers compete in a format consisting of four rounds of stroke play, with a cut after the third round, out of which the lowest 60 scores, including ties, qualify for the final round.

Winners

In 2017, Plant won with a birdie at the second hole of a sudden-death playoff after he and Cianchetti had earlier tied a three-hole playoff at level par, Scalise being eliminated at one-over-par. In 2016, Cianchetti won with a par at the fourth hole of a sudden-death playoff after he and Hovland had earlier tied a three-hole playoff. In 2010, Trappel won the three-hole playoff. In 1993, Backhausen won the three-hole playoff by two strokes.

External links
European Golf Association
Past results

Amateur golf tournaments
Golf tournaments in Europe